The 1942–43 Ohio Bobcats men's basketball team represented Ohio University in the college basketball season of 1942–43. The team was coached by Dutch Trautwein and played their home games at the Men's Gymnasium.  They finished the season 11–7 .

Schedule

|-
!colspan=9 style=| Regular Season

 Source:

References

Ohio Bobcats men's basketball seasons
1942 in sports in Ohio
1943 in sports in Ohio